The Fellsman is an annual organised walk and fell race of about sixty miles in the Yorkshire Dales from Ingleton to Threshfield.

History

The event was devised by Don Thompson and the Brighouse District (Brigantes) Rover Crew and the first hike was held in 1962, with the route then running in the opposite direction from the present one. The organisation was later taken on by the Keighley Scout Service Team. The Team has since changed its name to Keighley Scout Service Network.

Route
The route includes Ingleborough, Whernside, Gragareth, Great Coum, Dent, Blea Moor, Great Knoutberry, Snaizeholme, Dodd Fell, Fleet Moss, Middle Tongue, Cray, Buckden Pike, Great Whernside before finishing in Threshfield. Much of the course is on private land with secured access from the land-owners for the race period only.

Results
The winners of the event have been as follows.

See also
Bill Smith (fell runner)

References

External links
 The Fellsman Website

Fell running competitions
Scouting events
Sport in Yorkshire
Ultramarathons in the United Kingdom
Yorkshire Dales